Boże, coś Polskę is a Polish Catholic patriotic hymn. When Poland gained its independence in 1918, it 
competed with  Mazurek Dąbrowskiego for the right to be the national anthem of Poland. Its title is usually given as God Save Poland in English, as a hint to God Save the King. Literally it is translated as "Lord, who Poland..." from the first lines of the hymn "Boże! Coś Polskę przez tak liczne wieki / Otaczał blaskiem potęgi i chwały...", "Lord! Who for so many ages enclosed Poland with the light of power and glory...". Other translations of the title (and the text of the hymn) exist, such as "O Thou Lord God".

The original text was authored by Alojzy Feliński published in Gazeta Warszawska on July 20, 1816, to the glory of the monarch of the Congress Kingdom of Poland, i.e., the Russian Emperor Alexander I, which since 1818 was known under the title . It caused a good deal of controversy and already in the next year the last line of the refrain was unofficially sung as Naszą ojczyznę racz nam wrócić, Panie ("deign to give us back our homeland, Lord") instead of Naszego króla zachowaj nam Panie! ("Save our king for us, Lord"). Over time the text was subject to other changes. In February 1817 a hymn Hymn do Boga o zachowanie wolności (incipit: O Ty! którego potężna prawica...) by Antoni Gorecki was published. From the latter two stanzas were included into Boże, coś Polskę.

Text sampler

Polish

The original text by Alojzy Feliński:
 Boże! Coś Polskę przez tak liczne wieki
 Otaczał blaskiem potęgi i chwały
 I tarczą swojej zasłaniał opieki
 Od nieszczęść, które przywalić ją miały
 Przed Twe ołtarze zanosim błaganie,
 Naszego Króla zachowaj nam Panie!

Final version:
Boże, coś Polskę przez tak liczne wieki
Otaczał blaskiem potęg i chwały,
Coś ją osłaniał tarczą swej opieki
Od nieszczęść, które przygnębić ją miały.
Przed Twe ołtarze zanosim błaganie:
Ojczyznę wolną racz nam wrócić, Panie!

Translations

From US congressional records:
O God, who, for so many centuries
Has granted to Poland the splendor of might and glory, 
Who, with the shield of Your protection,
Saved her from the misfortune designed to destroy her;
Before Your Altars, we offer our prayers:
Return to us, O Lord, our free fatherland.

English version by Mary McDowell from Folk Songs of Many Peoples:
O Thou Lord God, who for so many ages
Didst give to Poland splendor and might
Who shielded her from storms' wild rages
And kept her ever in Thy holy sight.
Father, we kneel to plead before Thy throne,
Give to us freedom, give to us our own!

References

Catholic Church in Poland
Polish Christian hymns